Danger Force is an American comedy television series developed by Christopher J. Nowak that premiered on Nickelodeon on March 28, 2020. The series is a spinoff of Henry Danger and includes returning stars Cooper Barnes and Michael D. Cohen. Starring alongside them are Havan Flores, Terrence Little Gardenhigh, Dana Heath, and Luca Luhan.

Series overview

Episodes

Season 1 (2020–21)

Season 2 (2021–22)

Shorts

Notes

References 

Lists of American children's television series episodes
Lists of American comedy television series episodes
Lists of Nickelodeon television series episodes